Sankt Oswald may refer to the following places:

Sankt Oswald-Riedlhütte, in Bavaria, Germany
in Austria:
Sankt Oswald, Lower Austria, in Lower Austria
Sankt Oswald bei Freistadt, in Upper Austria
Sankt Oswald bei Haslach, in Upper Austria
Sankt Oswald bei Plankenwarth, in Styria
Sankt Oswald ob Eibiswald, in Styria
Sankt Oswald-Möderbrugg, in Styria